HU-243 (AM-4056) is a synthetic cannabinoid drug that is a single enantiomer of the hydrogenated derivative of the commonly used reference agonist HU-210. It is a methylene homologue of canbisol. It is a potent agonist at both the CB1 and CB2 receptors, with a binding affinity of 0.041 nM at the CB1 receptor, making it marginally more potent than HU-210, which had an affinity of 0.061 nM in the same assay.

Legal status
HU-243 is not listed in the schedules set out by the United Nations' Single Convention on Narcotic Drugs from 1961 nor their Convention on Psychotropic Substances from 1971, so the signatory countries to these international drug control treaties are not required by said treaties to control HU-243.

United States
HU-243 is not listed in the list of scheduled controlled substances in the USA. It is therefore not scheduled at the federal level in the United States, but it is possible that HU-243 could legally be considered an analog of THC (which is one of the substances controlled in Schedule I as "tetrahydrocannabinols") or another synthetic Schedule I cannabinoids such as CP-47,497, and therefore sales or possession could potentially be prosecuted under the Federal Analogue Act.

Florida
HU-243 is a Schedule I controlled substance, categorized as a hallucinogen, making it illegal to buy, sell, or possess in the state of Florida without a license.

Vermont
Effective January 1, 2016, HU-243 is probably (a little doubt arises due to apparent mistaken naming) a regulated drug in Vermont designated as a "Hallucinogenic Drug."

The above chemical name ("3-dimethylheptyl-11-hydroxyhexahydrocannabinol") and common ("canbisol") or trade names ("nabidrox") are not the same chemical as HU-243. They identify Canbisol, of which HU-243 is a methylene homologue.

See also 
 11-OH-HHC
 AM-2389
 AM-11245
 Nabidrox (canbisol)
 Nabilone

References 

HU cannabinoids
Benzochromenes
Primary alcohols
Phenols